The Lorentz group is a Lie group of symmetries of the spacetime of special relativity.  This group can be realized as a collection of matrices, linear transformations, or unitary operators on some Hilbert space; it has a variety of representations.  This group is significant because special relativity together with quantum mechanics are the two physical theories that are most thoroughly established, and the conjunction of these two theories is the study of the infinite-dimensional unitary representations of the Lorentz group.  These have both historical importance in mainstream physics, as well as connections to more speculative present-day theories.

Development

The full theory of the finite-dimensional representations of the Lie algebra of the Lorentz group is deduced using the general framework of the representation theory of semisimple Lie algebras. The finite-dimensional representations of the connected component  of the full Lorentz group  are obtained by employing the Lie correspondence and the matrix exponential. The representatives of time reversal and space inversion are given in space inversion and time reversal, completing the finite-dimensional theory for the full Lorentz group. The general properties of the (m, n) representations are outlined. Action on function spaces is considered, with the action on spherical harmonics and the Riemann P-functions appearing as examples. The infinite-dimensional case of irreducible unitary representations are realized for the  principal series and the complementary series.

The development of the representation theory has historically followed the development of the more general theory of representation theory of semisimple groups, largely due to Élie Cartan and Hermann Weyl, but the Lorentz group has also received special attention due to its importance in physics. Notable contributors are physicist E. P. Wigner and mathematician Valentine Bargmann with their Bargmann–Wigner program, one conclusion of which is, roughly, a classification of all unitary representations of the inhomogeneous Lorentz group amounts to a classification of all possible relativistic wave equations. The classification of the irreducible infinite-dimensional representations of the Lorentz group was established by Paul Dirac's doctoral student in theoretical physics, Harish-Chandra, later turned mathematician, in 1947.

Applications 
Many of the representations, both finite-dimensional and infinite-dimensional, are important in theoretical physics. Representations appear in the description of fields in classical field theory, most importantly the electromagnetic field, and of particles in relativistic quantum mechanics, as well as of both particles and quantum fields in quantum field theory and of various objects in string theory and beyond. The representation theory also provides the theoretical ground for the concept of spin. The theory enters into general relativity in the sense that in small enough regions of spacetime, physics is that of special relativity.

The finite-dimensional irreducible non-unitary representations together with the irreducible infinite-dimensional unitary representations of the inhomogeneous Lorentz group, the Poincare group, are the representations that have direct physical relevance.

Infinite-dimensional unitary representations of the Lorentz group appear by restriction of the irreducible infinite-dimensional unitary representations of the Poincaré group acting on the Hilbert spaces of relativistic quantum mechanics and quantum field theory. But these are also of mathematical interest and of potential direct physical relevance in other roles than that of a mere restriction. There were speculative theories, (tensors and spinors have infinite counterparts in the expansors of Dirac and the expinors of Harish-Chandra) consistent with relativity and quantum mechanics, but they have found no proven physical application. Modern speculative theories potentially have similar ingredients per below.

Classical field theory 
While the electromagnetic field together with the gravitational field are the only classical fields providing accurate descriptions of nature, other types of classical fields are important too. In the approach to quantum field theory (QFT) referred to as second quantization, the starting point is one or more classical fields, where e.g. the wave functions solving the Dirac equation are considered as classical fields prior to (second) quantization. While second quantization and the Lagrangian formalism associated with it is not a fundamental aspect of QFT, it is the case that so far all quantum field theories can be approached this way, including the standard model. In these cases, there are classical versions of the field equations following from the Euler–Lagrange equations derived from the Lagrangian using the principle of least action. These field equations must be relativistically invariant, and their solutions (which will qualify as relativistic wave functions according to the definition below) must transform under some representation of the Lorentz group.

The action of the Lorentz group on the space of field configurations (a field configuration is the spacetime history of a particular solution, e.g. the electromagnetic field in all of space over all time is one field configuration) resembles the action on the Hilbert spaces of quantum mechanics, except that the commutator brackets are replaced by field theoretical Poisson brackets.

Relativistic quantum mechanics 
For the present purposes the following definition is made: A relativistic wave function is a set of  functions  on spacetime which transforms under an arbitrary proper Lorentz transformation  as

where  is an -dimensional matrix representative of  belonging to some direct sum of the  representations to be introduced below.

The most useful relativistic quantum mechanics one-particle theories (there are no fully consistent such theories) are the Klein–Gordon equation and the Dirac equation in their original setting. They are relativistically invariant and their solutions transform under the Lorentz group as Lorentz scalars and bispinors respectively. The electromagnetic field is a relativistic wave function according to this definition, transforming under .

The infinite-dimensional representations may be used in the analysis of scattering.

Quantum field theory 
In quantum field theory, the demand for relativistic invariance enters, among other ways in that the S-matrix necessarily must be Poincaré invariant. This has the implication that there is one or more infinite-dimensional representation of the Lorentz group acting on Fock space. One way to guarantee the existence of such representations is the existence of a Lagrangian description (with modest requirements imposed, see the reference) of the system using the canonical formalism, from which a realization of the generators of the Lorentz group may be deduced.

The transformations of field operators illustrate the complementary role played by the finite-dimensional representations of the Lorentz group and the infinite-dimensional unitary representations of the Poincare group, witnessing the deep unity between mathematics and physics. For illustration, consider the definition an -component field operator: A relativistic field operator is a set of  operator valued functions on spacetime which transforms under proper Poincaré transformations  according to

The transformation rule is the second Wightman axiom of quantum field theory.

By considerations of differential constraints that the field operator must be subjected to in order to describe a single particle with definite mass  and spin  (or helicity), it is deduced that

where  are interpreted as creation and annihilation operators respectively. The creation operator  transforms according to

and similarly for the annihilation operator. The point to be made is that the field operator transforms according to a finite-dimensional non-unitary representation of the Lorentz group, while the creation operator transforms under the infinite-dimensional unitary representation of the Poincare group characterized by the mass and spin  of the particle. The connection between the two are the wave functions, also called coefficient functions

that carry both the indices  operated on by Lorentz transformations and the indices  operated on by Poincaré transformations. This may be called the Lorentz–Poincaré connection. To exhibit the connection, subject both sides of equation  to a Lorentz transformation resulting in for e.g. ,

All of the above formulas, including the definition of the field operator in terms of creation and annihilation operators, as well as the differential equations satisfied by the field operator for a particle with specified mass, spin and the  representation under which it is supposed to transform, and also that of the wave function, can be derived from group theoretical considerations alone once the frameworks of quantum mechanics and special relativity is given.

Speculative theories 

The requirement of Lorentz invariance takes on perhaps its most dramatic effect in string theory. Classical relativistic strings can be handled in the Lagrangian framework by using the Nambu–Goto action. This results in a relativistically invariant theory in any spacetime dimension. But as it turns out, the theory of open and closed bosonic strings (the simplest string theory) is impossible to quantize in such a way that the Lorentz group is represented on the space of states (a Hilbert space) unless the dimension of spacetime is 26. The corresponding result for superstring theory is again deduced demanding Lorentz invariance, but now with supersymmetry. In these theories the Poincaré algebra is replaced by a supersymmetry algebra which is a -graded Lie algebra extending the Poincaré algebra. The structure of such an algebra is to a large degree fixed by the demands of Lorentz invariance. The only possible dimension of spacetime in such theories is 10.

Finite-dimensional representations 
Representation theory of groups in general, and Lie groups in particular, is a very rich subject. The Lorentz group has some properties that makes it "agreeable" and others that make it "not very agreeable" within the context of representation theory; the group is simple and thus semisimple, but is not connected, and none of its components are simply connected. Furthermore, the Lorentz group is not compact.

For finite-dimensional representations, the presence of semisimplicity means that the Lorentz group can be dealt with the same way as other semisimple groups using a well-developed theory. In addition, all representations are built from the irreducible ones, since the Lie algebra possesses the complete reducibility property. But, the non-compactness of the Lorentz group, in combination with lack of simple connectedness, cannot be dealt with in all the aspects as in the simple framework that applies to simply connected, compact groups. Non-compactness implies, for a connected simple Lie group, that no nontrivial finite-dimensional unitary representations exist. Lack of simple connectedness gives rise to spin representations of the group. The non-connectedness means that, for representations of the full Lorentz group, time reversal and space inversion has to be dealt with separately.

History 
The development of the finite-dimensional representation theory of the Lorentz group mostly follows that of the subject in general. Lie theory originated with Sophus Lie in 1873. By 1888 the classification of simple Lie algebras was essentially completed by Wilhelm Killing. In 1913 the theorem of highest weight for representations of simple Lie algebras, the path that will be followed here, was completed by Élie Cartan. Richard Brauer was during the period of 1935–38 largely responsible for the development of the Weyl-Brauer matrices describing how spin representations of the Lorentz Lie algebra can be embedded in Clifford algebras. The Lorentz group has also historically received special attention in representation theory, see History of infinite-dimensional unitary representations below, due to its exceptional importance in physics. Mathematicians Hermann Weyl and Harish-Chandra and physicists Eugene Wigner and Valentine Bargmann made substantial contributions both to general representation theory and in particular to the Lorentz group. Physicist Paul Dirac was perhaps the first to manifestly knit everything together in a practical application of major lasting importance with the Dirac equation in 1928.

The Lie algebra

The irreducible complex linear representations of the complexification,  of the Lie algebra  of the Lorentz group are to be found. They are explicitly given in conventions and Lie algebra bases.

The Lie algebra is complexified, and the basis is changed to the components of its two ideals

One has the isomorphisms

where  is the complexification of 

These are explicitly given in complex linear representations of

The unitarian trick

By appeal to simple connectedness, the second statement of the unitarian trick is applied. The objects in the following list are in one-to-one correspondence:
 Holomorphic representations of 
 Smooth representations of 
 Real linear representations of 
 Complex linear representations of 

Tensor products of representations appear at the Lie algebra level as either of

where  is the identity operator. (The highest weights are actually , but the notation here is adapted to that of ) The tensor products of two such complex linear factors then form the irreducible complex linear representations of 

The (μ, ν)-representations of sl(2, C) 
All others are real linear only.

(The labeling is usually in the mathematics literature , but half-integers are chosen here to conform with the labeling for the  Lie algebra.) These representations are concretely realized below.

The (m, n)-representations of so(3; 1) 
The representations of  obtained this way are real linear (and not complex or conjugate linear) because the algebra is not closed upon conjugation, but they are still irreducible. Since  is semisimple, all its representations can be built up as direct sums of the irreducible ones.

where  is a finite-dimensional vector space. These are, up to a similarity transformation, uniquely given by

where  is the -dimensional unit matrix and

are the -dimensional irreducible representations of  also termed spin matrices or angular momentum matrices. These are explicitly given as

where  denotes the Kronecker delta.

Common representations 

 The  representation is the one-dimensional trivial representation and is carried by relativistic scalar field theories.
 The four-momentum of a particle (either massless or massive) transforms under the  representation, a four-vector.
 A physical example of a (1,1) traceless symmetric tensor field is the traceless part of the energy–momentum tensor .

Off-diagonal direct sums 
Since for any irreducible representation for which  it is essential to operate over the field of complex numbers, the direct sum of representations  and  have particular relevance to physics, since it permits to use linear operators over real numbers.

  is the bispinor representation. See also Dirac spinor and Weyl spinors and bispinors below.
  is the Rarita–Schwinger field representation.
  would be the symmetry of the hypothesized gravitino. It can be obtained from the  representation.
  is the representation of a parity-invariant 2-form field (a.k.a. curvature form). The electromagnetic field tensor transforms under this representation.

The group 
The approach in this section is based on theorems that, in turn, are based on the fundamental Lie correspondence. The Lie correspondence is in essence a dictionary between connected Lie groups and Lie algebras. The link between them is the exponential mapping from the Lie algebra to the Lie group, denoted 

This definition applies whether the resulting representation is projective or not.

Surjectiveness of exponential map for SO(3, 1) 
From a practical point of view, it is important whether the first formula in  can be used for all elements of the group.

But  is surjective. One way to show this is to make use of the isomorphism  the latter being the Möbius group. The quotient map is denoted with  The map  is onto. Then

Fundamental group 
The Lorentz group is doubly connected, i. e.   is a group with two equivalence classes of loops as its elements.

Projective representations 
Since  has two elements, some representations of the Lie algebra will yield projective representations.

For the Lorentz group, the -representation is projective when  is a half-integer. See .

since any loop in  traversed twice, due to the double connectedness, is contractible to a point, so that its homotopy class is that of a constant map. It follows that  is a double-valued function.

The covering group SL(2, C) 
Consider  as a real Lie algebra with basis

where the sigmas are the Pauli matrices. From the relations

is obtained

A geometric view 

Define the set

and endow it with the multiplication operation

Since each  has two elements, by the above construction, there is a 2:1 covering map .

An algebraic view 
For an algebraic view of the universal covering group, let  act on the set of all Hermitian  matrices  by the operation

An element of  may be written in the form

Its kernel must in particular take the identity matrix to itself,  and therefore . The space  is mapped to Minkowski space , via

preserves the Lorentz inner product since

This means that  belongs to the full Lorentz group .

Non-surjectiveness of exponential mapping for SL(2, C) 

The exponential mapping  is not onto. The matrix

is in  but there is no  such that .

The matrix  can be written

They can be (and usually are) written down from scratch. The holomorphic group representations (meaning the corresponding Lie algebra representation is complex linear) are related to the complex linear Lie algebra representations by exponentiation. They can be exponentiated too. The -representations are complex linear and are (isomorphic to) the highest weight-representations. These are usually indexed with only one integer (but half-integers are used here).

The mathematics convention is used in this section for convenience. Let the basis of   be

This choice of basis, and the notation, is standard in the mathematical literature.

Complex linear representations 
The irreducible holomorphic -dimensional representations   can be realized on the space of homogeneous polynomial of degree  in 2 variables  the elements of which are

The associated -action is, using  and the definition above, for the basis elements of 

Real linear representations 

By employing  again it is found that

In particular for the basis elements,

Properties of the (m, n) representations 

Dimension 
The  representations are -dimensional. For a Lie general algebra  the Weyl dimension formula,

The inner product  is that of the Lie algebra  invariant under the action of the Weyl group on  the Cartan subalgebra. By taking tensor products, the result follows.

Faithfulness 
If a representation  of a Lie group  is not faithful, then  is a nontrivial normal subgroup. There are three relevant cases.
 is non-discrete and abelian.
 is non-discrete and non-abelian.
 is discrete.
The second case (and the first case) is excluded because  is simple. The conclusion is that every representation  and every projective representation  for  finite-dimensional vector spaces are faithful.

Non-unitarity 
The  Lie algebra representation is not Hermitian. Accordingly, the corresponding (projective) representation of the group is never unitary. This is due to the non-compactness of the Lorentz group. In fact, a connected simple non-compact Lie group cannot have any nontrivial unitary finite-dimensional representations. There is a topological proof of this. Let , where  is finite-dimensional, be a continuous unitary representation of the non-compact connected simple Lie group . This would mean that  is an embedded non-compact Lie subgroup of the compact group . This is impossible with the subspace topology on  since all embedded Lie subgroups of a Lie group are closed If  were closed, it would be compact, and then  would be compact, contrary to assumption.

In the case of the Lorentz group, this can also be seen directly from the definitions. This means that  is Hermitian, but  is anti-Hermitian. The non-unitarity is not a problem in quantum field theory, since the objects of concern are not required to have a Lorentz-invariant positive definite norm.

Restriction to SO(3) 
The  representation is, however, unitary when restricted to the rotation subgroup , but these representations are not irreducible as representations of SO(3). A Clebsch–Gordan decomposition can be applied showing that an  representation have -invariant subspaces of highest weight (spin) , where each possible highest weight (spin) occurs exactly once. A weight subspace of highest weight (spin)  is -dimensional. So for example, the ( ) representation has spin 1 and spin 0 subspaces of dimension 3 and 1 respectively.

Spinors 
It is the -invariant subspaces of the irreducible representations that determine whether a representation has spin. From the above paragraph, it is seen that the  representation has spin if  is half-integral. It cannot be ruled out in general, however, that representations with multiple  subrepresentations with different spin can represent physical particles with well-defined spin. It may be that there is a suitable relativistic wave equation that projects out unphysical components, leaving only a single spin.

Construction of pure spin  representations for any  (under ) from the irreducible representations involves taking tensor products of the Dirac-representation with a non-spin representation, extraction of a suitable subspace, and finally imposing differential constraints.

Dual representations 

The following theorems are applied to examine whether the dual representation of an irreducible representation is isomorphic to the original representation:
The set of weights of the dual representation of an irreducible representation of a semisimple Lie algebra is, including multiplicities, the negative of the set of weights for the original representation.
Two irreducible representations are isomorphic if and only if they have the same highest weight.
For each semisimple Lie algebra there exists a unique element  of the Weyl group such that if  is a dominant integral weight, then  is again a dominant integral weight.
If  is an irreducible representation with highest weight , then  has highest weight .
Here, the elements of the Weyl group are considered as orthogonal transformations, acting by matrix multiplication, on the real vector space of roots. If  is an element of the Weyl group of a semisimple Lie algebra, then . Inspection shows that  so .

Complex conjugate representations 
If  is a representation of a Lie algebra, then  is a representation, where the bar denotes entry-wise complex conjugation in the representative matrices. This follows from that complex conjugation commutes with addition and multiplication.

with  holomorphic (complex linear) and  anti-holomorphic (conjugate linear). For  since  is holomorphic,  is anti-holomorphic.

Using the above identities (interpreted as pointwise addition of functions), for  yields

It follows that the irreducible representations  have real matrix representatives if and only if . Reducible representations on the form  have real matrices too.

The adjoint representation, the Clifford algebra, and the Dirac spinor representation 

The induced 4-vector representation of above on this simplified  has an invariant 4-dimensional subspace that is spanned by the four gamma matrices. (The metric convention is different in the linked article.) In other words,

where, as is customary, a representation is confused with its representation space.

The  spin representation 

The six-dimensional representation space of the tensor -representation inside  has two roles. The

where  are the gamma matrices, the sigmas, only  of which are non-zero due to antisymmetry of the bracket, span the tensor representation space. Moreover, they have the commutation relations of the Lorentz Lie algebra,

and hence constitute a representation (in addition to spanning a representation space) sitting inside  the  spin representation. For details, see bispinor and Dirac algebra.

In addition, it has a spin-representation of the Lorentz Lie algebra, which upon exponentiation becomes a spin representation of the group, acting on  making it a space of bispinors.

Reducible representations 
There is a multitude of other representations that can be deduced from the irreducible ones, such as those obtained by taking direct sums, tensor products, and quotients of the irreducible representations. Other methods of obtaining representations include the restriction of a representation of a larger group containing the Lorentz group, e.g.  and the Poincaré group. These representations are in general not irreducible.

The Lorentz group and its Lie algebra have the complete reducibility property. This means that every representation reduces to a direct sum of irreducible representations. The reducible representations will therefore not be discussed.

Space inversion and time reversal 

The (possibly projective)  representation is irreducible as a representation , the identity component of the Lorentz group, in physics terminology the proper orthochronous Lorentz group. The representations  can be extended likewise.

Space parity inversion

This can hold only if  and  have the same dimensions, i.e. only if . The parity reversal representative  does not come automatically with the general construction of the  representations. It must be specified separately. The matrix  (or a multiple of modulus −1 times it) may be used in the  representation.

If parity is included with a minus sign (the  matrix ) in the  representation, it is called a pseudoscalar representation.

Time reversal 

A subtle problem appears however in application to physics, in particular quantum mechanics. These are interpreted as generators of translations. The time-component  is the Hamiltonian . The operator  satisfies the relation

in analogy to the relations above with  replaced by the full Poincaré algebra. By just cancelling the 's, the result  would imply that for every state  with positive energy  in a Hilbert space of quantum states with time-reversal invariance, there would be a state  with negative energy . Such states do not exist. It may be expressed as the composition of complex conjugation with multiplication by a unitary matrix. This is mathematically sound, see Wigner's theorem, but with very strict requirements on terminology,  is not a representation.

When constructing theories such as QED which is invariant under space parity and time reversal, Dirac spinors may be used, while theories that do not, such as the electroweak force, must be formulated in terms of Weyl spinors. The Dirac representation, is usually taken to include both space parity and time inversions. Without space parity inversion, it is not an irreducible representation.

Action on function spaces 
If  is a vector space of functions of a finite number of variables , then the action on a scalar function  given by

produces another function . This is the setting in which the Peter–Weyl theorem and the Borel–Weil theorem are formulated. The former demonstrates the existence of a Fourier decomposition of functions on a compact group into characters of finite-dimensional representations. The latter theorem, providing more explicit representations, makes use of the unitarian trick to yield representations of complex non-compact groups, e.g. 

The following exemplifies action of the Lorentz group and the rotation subgroup on some function spaces.

Euclidean rotations 

The subgroup  of three-dimensional Euclidean rotations has an infinite-dimensional representation on the Hilbert space

where  are the spherical harmonics. An arbitrary square integrable function  one the unit sphere can be expressed as

The Möbius group 

The identity component of the Lorentz group is isomorphic to the Möbius group . This group can be thought of as conformal mappings of either the complex plane or, via stereographic projection, the Riemann sphere. In this way, the Lorentz group itself can be thought of as acting conformally on the complex plane or on the Riemann sphere.

In the plane, a Möbius transformation characterized by the complex numbers  acts on the plane according to

and can be represented by complex matrices

since multiplication by a nonzero complex scalar does not change .

The Riemann P-functions 

The Riemann P-functions, solutions of Riemann's differential equation, are an example of a set of functions that transform among themselves under the action of the Lorentz group. The Riemann P-functions are expressed as

The P-function on the right hand side can be expressed using standard hypergeometric functions. The connection is

The set of constants  in the upper row on the left hand side are the regular singular points of the Gauss' hypergeometric equation.

One has thus

where the condition (sometimes called Riemann's identity)

on the exponents of the solutions of Riemann's differential equation has been used to define .

Define an action of the Lorentz group on the set of all Riemann P-functions by first setting

where  are the entries in

for  a Lorentz transformation.

Define

where  is a Riemann P-function. The resulting function is again a Riemann P-function. The effect of the Möbius transformation of the argument is that of shifting the poles to new locations, hence changing the critical points, but there is no change in the exponents of the differential equation the new function satisfies. The new function is expressed as

where

Infinite-dimensional unitary representations

History
In  he proposed a concrete infinite-dimensional representation space whose elements were called expansors as a generalization of tensors. These ideas were incorporated by Harish–Chandra and expanded with expinors as an infinite-dimensional generalization of spinors in his 1947 paper.

The Plancherel formula for these groups was first obtained by Gelfand and Naimark through involved calculations.

The theory of spherical functions for the Lorentz group, required for harmonic analysis on the hyperboloid model of 3-dimensional hyperbolic space sitting in Minkowski space is considerably easier than the general theory.

Principal series for SL(2, C)

When , these representations constitute the so-called spherical principal series.

It is the representation induced from the 1-dimensional representation , and is independent of . By Frobenius reciprocity, on  they decompose as a direct sum of the irreducible representations of  with dimensions  with  a non-negative integer.

Irreducibility can be checked in a variety of ways:

 The representation is already irreducible on . This can be seen directly, but is also a special case of general results on irreducibility of induced representations due to François Bruhat and George Mackey, relying on the Bruhat decomposition  where  is the Weyl group element .
 The action of the Lie algebra  of  can be computed on the algebraic direct sum of the irreducible subspaces of  can be computed explicitly and the it can be verified directly that the lowest-dimensional subspace generates this direct sum as a -module.

Complementary series for  

with the action given by

The representations in the complementary series are irreducible and pairwise non-isomorphic.

Plancherel theorem for SL(2, C)

To decompose the left regular representation of  on  only the principal series are required. This immediately yields the decomposition on the subrepresentations  the left regular representation of the Lorentz group, and  the regular representation on 3-dimensional hyperbolic space.

is Hilbert–Schmidt. Define a Hilbert space  by

where

extends to a unitary of  onto .

The map  satisfies the intertwining property

If  are in  then by unitarity

The last two displayed formulas are usually referred to as the Plancherel formula and the Fourier inversion formula respectively.

It can be extended to much wider classes of functions satisfying mild differentiability conditions.

Classification of representations of  
The strategy followed in the classification of the irreducible infinite-dimensional representations is, in analogy to the finite-dimensional case, to assume they exist, and to investigate their properties. Since  is a subgroup,  is a representation of it as well.

The steps are the following:
Enforce Lie algebra commutation relations.
Require unitarity together with orthonormality of the basis.

Step 1 
One suitable choice of basis and labeling is given by

In the infinite-dimensional case,  retains this meaning, but  does not. For simplicity, it is assumed that a given  occurs at most once in a given representation (this is the case for finite-dimensional representations), and it can be shown that the assumption is possible to avoid (with a slightly more complicated calculation) with the same results.

Step 2 

where the labels  and  have been dropped since they are the same for all basis vectors in the representation.

Due to the commutation relations  the triple  is a vector operator and the Wigner–Eckart theorem applies for computation of matrix elements between the states represented by the chosen basis. The matrix elements of

The second factors are the reduced matrix elements. For a complete list of non-vanishing equations, see .

Step 3 
The next step is to demand that the Lie algebra relations hold, i.e. that

This results in a set of equations for which the solutions are

where

Step 4 
Unitarity of the group representation translates to the requirement of the Lie algebra representatives being Hermitian, meaning

This translates to

leading to

There are two possible cases:

  In this case ,  real,  This is the principal series. Its elements are denoted 
This is complementary series. Its elements are denoted 

This shows that the representations of above are all infinite-dimensional irreducible unitary representations.

Explicit formulas

Conventions and Lie algebra bases 
These choices are arbitrary, but once they are made, fixed. One possible choice of basis for the Lie algebra is, in the 4-vector representation, given by:

The commutation relations of the Lie algebra  are:

In three-dimensional notation, these are

The choice of basis above satisfies the relations, but other choices are possible.

For example, a typical boost and a typical rotation exponentiate as,

symmetric and orthogonal, respectively.

Weyl spinors and bispinors 

These are the left-handed and right-handed Weyl spinor representations. Given

their direct sum as representations is formed,

The representation may be obtained in a more general and basis independent way using Clifford algebras. These expressions for bispinors and Weyl spinors all extend by linearity of Lie algebras and representations to all of  Expressions for the group representations are obtained by exponentiation.

Open problems
The classification and characterization of the representation theory of the Lorentz group was completed in 1947. But in association with the Bargmann–Wigner programme, there are yet unresolved purely mathematical problems, linked to the infinite-dimensional unitary representations.

The irreducible infinite-dimensional unitary representations may have indirect relevance to physical reality in speculative modern theories since the (generalized) Lorentz group appears as the little group of the Poincaré group of spacelike vectors in higher spacetime dimension. The corresponding infinite-dimensional unitary representations of the (generalized) Poincaré group are the so-called tachyonic representations. Tachyons appear in the spectrum of bosonic strings and are associated with instability of the vacuum. Even though tachyons may not be realized in nature, these representations must be mathematically understood in order to understand string theory. This is so since tachyon states turn out to appear in superstring theories too in attempts to create realistic models.

One open problem is the completion of the Bargmann–Wigner programme for the isometry group  of the de Sitter spacetime .

See also 
 Bargmann–Wigner equations
 Dirac algebra
 Gamma matrices
 Lorentz group
 Möbius transformation
 Poincaré group
 Representation theory of the Poincaré group
 Symmetry in quantum mechanics
 Wigner's classification

Remarks

Notes

Freely available online references
 Expanded version of the lectures presented at the second Modave summer school in mathematical physics (Belgium, August 2006).
 Group elements of SU(2) are expressed in closed form as finite polynomials of the Lie algebra generators, for all definite spin representations of the rotation group.

References

 (the representation theory of SO(2,1) and SL(2, R); the second part on SO(3; 1) and SL(2, C), described in the introduction, was never published).

 (free access)

 (a general introduction for physicists)

 (elementary treatment for SL(2,C))

 

 (a detailed account for physicists)

 (James K. Whittemore Lectures in Mathematics given at Yale University, 1967)

, Chapter 9, SL(2, C) and more general Lorentz groups

.

Representation theory of Lie groups
Special relativity
Quantum mechanics